Prodoxus gypsicolor is a moth of the family Prodoxidae. It is found in the United States in the Kingston Range of the north-eastern Mojave Desert and possibly the Grand Canyon National Park in central-northern Arizona.

The wingspan is 11.2-16.2 mm for males and 12-19.1 mm for females. The forewings are calcareous white and the hindwings are brownish gray. Adults are on wing from late March to early April.

The larvae feed on Agave utahensis.

Etymology
The species name refers to the chalk white color of the forewings.

References

Moths described in 2005
Prodoxidae